Venezuela made its Paralympic Games début at the 1984 Summer Paralympics in Stoke Mandeville and New York, sending five competitors in athletics and one in swimming. Absent from the Games in 1988, it returned in 1992, and has participated in every edition of the Summer Paralympics since then. Venezuela has never taken part in the Winter Paralympics.

Although never a major medal contender, Venezuela has improved its medal intake over time. Having won no medals in 1984 or 1996, a single bronze in 1992 (Yolmer Urdaneta's in the men's discus) and a single bronze also in 2000 (Ricardo Santana's in the men's 200m T13 in athletics), it achieved its first silver (Santana in the 100m) and two bronze in 2004. The country's first Paralympic gold medal was won in 2008 by Naomi Soazo in the women's up to 63kg in judo. 2020 marked Venezuela's highest achievement to date, with three gold, two silver, and two bronze.

The country's medal tally following the 2020 Games places it 73nd on the all-time Paralympic Games medal table.

Medalists

See also
 Venezuela at the Olympics

References